Teresa Paz Paneque Carreño (born November 15, 1997) is a Spanish-Chilean astronomer and writer.

Biography

Early years and education
Paneque was born in Madrid, Spain, in 1997. Her father is a biochemist and her mother a pharmaceutic chemist. When she was five years old, she moved to Glasgow due to her parent's postdoctoral research. At the age of nine, she moved to Chile, and due to her education in Europe, she entered the 6th grade of primary school, two years before the corresponding age; there, she began to be interested by robotics, taking part in the Chile's FIRST Lego League Challenge.

She has a Bachelor's and Master's degree in astronomy, both of the University of Chile, since 2020, she is studying a Doctorate in the same area in the European Southern Observatory (Germany) and the Leiden University (Netherlands).

Work
She is known in Chile for her book "El Universo Según Carlota" (The Universe According to Carlota), an illustrated book, for kids and young people, in which she explains, with the reality of the Universe, what a shooting star is like.

She is a pop scientist in social media since 2019, with more than 440k followers in her TikTok, Instagram and Twitter accounts. Along the social networking, she also has participated in national events carried out by University of Chile, the Chilean Antarctic Institute, and Congreso Futuro. She also is frecuentily part of "A Última Hora" (At The Last Minute), a radio show of Radio Cooperative. In 2021, she created the podcast "Fuera de Órbita" (Out of Orbit), for the radio station TXS Plus.

In January 2022, she made new when she entered in a hard debate in social media, about the veracity and the little evidence on which astrology is based, this caused that she was engrossed in a discussion on Twitter. with a Chilean astrologist and sociologist.

Investigation area
Her area of investigation is the formation of planets, specifically the study of the chemical conditions in the environments of planetary formation. She is co-author of a 2021 scientific publication which describes gravitational instability of Elias 2-27 star, giving evidence about the gravitational instability in Protoplanetary disks.

Awards
She was awarded by the Physics and Math Sciences Faculty of the University of Chile, for the best post grade thesis of 2021, and for the Fundación Mujeres Bacnas ("Cool Women Foundation"), as the U-30 Cool Woman of 2020 (Bacana Sub-30 de 2020).

Publications

Books

References

External links

 Leiden University website

Living people

1997 births
Spanish emigrants to Chile
21st-century astronomers
21st-century Chilean scientists
Chilean women scientists
People from Madrid
University of Chile alumni
Women planetary scientists
Scientists from Madrid